Frigo is a surname. Notable people with the surname include:

 Armando Frigo (1917–1943), former Italian-American soccer player
 Dario Frigo (born 1973), former professional road bicycle racer
 Franco Frigo (born 1950), Italian politician from Veneto
 Giuseppe Frigo (1935–2019), Italian judge
 Johnny Frigo (1916–2007), American jazz violinist and bassist
 Leo Frigo (1931–2001), American businessman and philanthropist
 Mark Frigo, American economist
 Rudi Frigo (born 1974), former Australian rules footballer

Fictional characters:
Mario Frigo, fictional character in Just Cause 3
Tommy Frigo, fictional character in Adventureland